The Central Russian Upland (also Central Upland and East European Upland) is an upland area of the East European Plain and is an undulating plateau with an average elevation of . The southeastern portion of the upland known as the Kalach Upland. The Central Upland is built of Precambrian deposits of the crystalline Voronezh Massif.

Location
It spans approximately 180,000 miles² (480,000 km2) in central and southern European Russia northeast of Ukraine, extending from the Oka river to the Donets river. The upland stretches across number of regions in Ukraine and the European portion of Russian Federation. Its north and northwest borders are considered to be Oka River and an imaginary line Kaluga-Ryazan. To the southeast towards the Donets River, the upland changes into the Donets Lowland. To the east its natural border is defined by the Oka–Don Lowland and to the west there is the Dnieper Lowland. Most of the upland lies within the borders of Russia, hence its name.

History

The Kostroma river and the city of the same name suggest that the area in Central Russia is an important reference point for the original home of the Slavic tribes. The river and city bear the same name as the Slavic goddess Kostroma.

Regions

 Bryansk Oblast
 Belgorod Oblast
 Voronezh Oblast
 Kursk Oblast
 Oryol Oblast
 Rostov Oblast
 Kharkiv Oblast (Ukraine)
 Sumy Oblast (Ukraine)
 Luhansk Oblast (Ukraine)

Tectonics
The Voronezh Massif is part of the East European Craton and southwesterly descends towards the Dnieper-Donets Through (Depression) which along with Prypiat Through forms the Prypiat-Dniper-Donets aulacogen. Most of the Voronezh Massif is covered with thin layers of sedimentary deposits of the Devonian, Jurassic, Cretaceous, and Paleogene periods. In the southeast along the Don River between the cities of Boguchar and Pavlovsk (both in Voronezh Oblast) the crystalline layers come to the surface. On all sides of the upland the Precambrian deposits descend far below the sedimentary layers. A small part of the upland in the northwest was covered with a glacier during the Dnieper glaciation. Today almost all of the upland is covered with loess and loessial loams.

References

External links
 Central Upland at the Encyclopedia of Ukraine.

Plateaus of Russia
Plateaus of Ukraine
East European Plain
Geography of Sumy Oblast
Geography of Kharkiv Oblast
Geography of Luhansk Oblast
Landforms of Kursk Oblast
Landforms of Belgorod Oblast
Landforms of Bryansk Oblast
Landforms of Voronezh Oblast
Landforms of Rostov Oblast
Landforms of Oryol Oblast
Geology of European Russia